A list of films produced in Saudi Arabia.

A
Architecture of Mud

B
Barakah Meets Barakah (2016)

C
Cinema 500 km (2006)

D
Dhilal al sammt (2006)

K
Keif al-Hal? (2006)

L
Langage du geste (1973)

M
Menahi (2009)

O

One Day in the Haram (2017)

S
Sahraa, Al- (2008)

T
The Perfect Candidate (2019)
Three Queens (2006)
The Tambour of Retribution (2020)
The 8th day of the week (2020)

W
Wadjda (2012)

External links
 Saudi film at the Internet Movie Database

Saudi